Dracaena paraguayensis, the Paraguay caiman lizard, is a species of lizard in the family Teiidae. It is found in Paraguay, Brazil and Bolivia.

References

Dracaena (lizard)
Reptiles described in 1950
Taxa named by Afrânio Pompílio Gastos do Amaral